Presbytera (pronounced presvytéra) is a Greek title of honor that is used to refer to a priest's wife.  It is derived from presbyteros—the Greek word for priest (literally, "elder").  Although 'Presbyteress' or 'eldress' has an equivalent meaning, it has a very small usage: most English-speaking Orthodox Christians will use the title most common in the old country churches from which their local family or parish finds its origin.

Other languages
Presbytera corresponds to the following equivalent titles:

 Albanian:  Prifteresha
 Armenian:  Yeretzgin
 Arabic:  خورية (khūrīah, from the word خوري khūrī , a title of Greek origin meaning "priest") or قسيسة (qasīsa, from the word قسيس qasīs , a title of Syriac origin meaning "priest")
 Bulgarian: Popadija (from the word pop, meaning married priest)
 Carpatho-Russian:  Pani (literally "lady," comparable to Pan for priests, meaning "lord")
 Coptic: Tasoni (pronounced TAH-son-ee, Coptic word for "Sister" but also used to address the wife of a priest)
 Estonian: Presvitera
 Finnish: Ruustinna (from the word rovasti (protoiereos), in Karelia: Maatuska)
 Italian: Presbitera
 Malayalam (Kerala, India): Kochamma literal meaning is little or young mother. In Syrian Christian churches, they are formally called "baskiamo" (from Syriac Bath  Qyomo).
 Macedonian: Popadija (from the word pop, meaning married priest)
 Portuguese: Presbítera
 Romanian:  Preoteasă
 Russian:  Matushka (pronounced MAH'-too-shkah, literally means "mama," i.e., the intimate form of "mother"); (antiquated) Popadya ("priest's wife")
 Serbian:  Popadija (from the word pop, meaning married priest); Protinica (pronounced proh-tee-NEE'-tsah) for a protopresbyter's wife
 Syriac: Bath  Qyomo (meaning  a  daughter  of  the  covenant)
 Ukrainian:  Panimatka or Panimatushka (pani, "lady" + matushka, loving, deminutivum form of "mama"); Dobrodijka (pronounced doh-BROH-deey-kah, literally means "a woman who does good"); Popadya ("priest's wife")

See also
 Diakonissa
 Episcopa Theodora

References

Further reading
 Presbytera:  The Life, Mission, and Service of the Priest's Wife, by Athanasia Papademetriou

External links
National Sisterhood of Presvyteres (GOARCH)
"The Orthodox Clergy Wife" by Matushka Valerie G. Zahirsky (Orthodox Family Life)
"The Shadow of a Priest" from Orthodox America
Clergy Etiquette

Eastern Christian ecclesiastical offices